Erich Gimpel (25 March 1910 in Merseburg – 3 September 2010 in São Paulo) was a German spy during World War II. Together with William Colepaugh, he took part in Operation Elster ("Magpie") an espionage mission to the United States in 1944, but was subsequently captured by the FBI in New York City.

German secret agent 
Gimpel had been a radio operator for mining companies in Peru in the 1930s. When World War II began, he became a secret agent, reporting the movement of enemy ships to Germany. When the United States entered the war in December 1941, Gimpel was deported back to Germany. He then served as an agent in Spain.

Gimpel was next chosen to attend a spy-school in Hamburg.  His final exam was to infiltrate German-occupied The Hague, where he first met the American malcontent and traitor William Colepaugh, an unstable drifter who would ultimately betray him.

Operation Elster 

Their mission was to gather technical information on the Allied war effort and transmit it back to Germany using an 80 watt radio transmitter Gimpel was expected to build.

Together they made their way to Boston and then by train to New York. Before long Colepaugh decided to abandon the mission, taking US$48,000 ($ today) of the currency they had brought and spending a month partying and carousing with local women.  After spending $1,500 ($ today) in less than a month, Colepaugh visited an old schoolfriend and asked for help to turn himself in to the FBI, hoping for immunity.  The FBI was already searching for German agents following the sinking of a Canadian ship a few miles off the Maine coastline (indicating a U-boat had been nearby) and suspicious sightings reported by local residents. The FBI interrogated Colepaugh, who revealed everything, enabling them to track down Gimpel.

Prisoner of war 
After Gimpel's capture, the spies were handed over to U.S. military authorities on the instructions of the Attorney General. In February 1945, they stood trial before a Military commission, accused of conspiracy and violating the 82nd Article of War. They were found guilty and sentenced to be hanged. An execution date was set for 15 April 1945. However, three days before their scheduled executions, President Franklin D. Roosevelt unexpectedly died. Due to a custom to not hold any executions during a period of state mourning, the executions were delayed. After the war ended, the sentences of both Gimpel and Colepaugh were commuted to life imprisonment.

Gimpel was sent to Alcatraz, where he played chess with Machine Gun Kelly. Gimpel was paroled in 1955, after serving 10 years in prison (Colepaugh would be paroled in 1960) and returned home to West Germany. Gimpel would later make his home in South America.

Post prison life 
Gimpel was the last person to be tried before a U.S. military tribunal in the Second World War. His autobiographical account of his undercover work, Spy For Germany, was first published in English in 1957, in Great Britain.

Following the terrorist attacks on the United States in September 2001, several books about Nazi spies in America were published, and his book finally appeared in the U.S. under the title Agent 146 (2003).

Gimpel was interviewed by Oliver North for his Fox News Channel program War Stories with Oliver North in the episode "Agent 146: Spying for the Third Reich".

The 100-year-old Gimpel died in São Paulo, Brazil on 3 September 2010.

Film
Erich Gimpel's career as a spy was dramatized in the 1956 film Spy for Germany (German title: Spion für Deutschland). The actor Martin Held played the leading role.

See also
John Codd
William Colepaugh

Notes

External links
 Photo of Gimpel on Sharkhunters
 Gimpel and Colepaugh 
 Article on Colepaugh and Gimpel at fas.org
 Allied report on the interrogation of Colepaugh and Gimpel at ibiblio.org
 Contains a report on Colepaugh and Gimpel at navy.mil
 On Gimpel and Colepaugh, an interview with former CIA agent Richard Gay, book author on foreign spies on US soil
 The movie "Spion für Deutschland (1956)" at IMDB
 G-Men Grab Two Nazi Spies

1910 births
2010 deaths
German centenarians
German people imprisoned abroad
German prisoners sentenced to death
People convicted of spying
Men centenarians
World War II spies for Germany
German emigrants to Brazil
Prisoners sentenced to death by the United States military
Recipients of American presidential clemency